Bedia is a railway station in Bedia, Basque Country, Spain. It is owned by Euskal Trenbide Sarea and operated by Euskotren. It lies on the Bilbao-San Sebastián line.

History 
The station opened as part of the Bilbao-Durango line in 1882.

Services 
The station is served by Euskotren Trena lines E1 and E4. Each of them runs every 30 minutes (in each direction) during weekdays, and every hour during weekends.

References

External links
 

Euskotren Trena stations
Railway stations in Biscay
Railway stations in Spain opened in 1882